The Holy Grail is a mystical object in the Arthurian legend.

Holy Grail is commonly used in a phrase to analogously denote something with high perceived value:

A rare, valuable object, source, event or difficult-to-reach goal in a given field:
Twin Sisters, the "Texas Holy Grail"
A rare acetate by the Beatles, with the songs "Hello Little Girl" and "Till There Was You"
A major, important unsolved problem in a given field; see Lists of unsolved problems
(For example, the Riemann hypothesis might be called "a holy grail" of mathematics, as could a theory of everything for physics, or P vs. NP for computational complexity theory)

Holy Grail may also refer to:
"Holy Grail" (Hunters & Collectors song), 1992
"Holy Grail" (Jay-Z song), 2013, featuring Justin Timberlake
Holy Grail (album), a 2011 album by Versailles
Monty Python and the Holy Grail, a 1975 comedy film
Holy Grail (band), a heavy metal band from Pasadena, California
Holy Grail tapestries, six tapestries woven by Morris & Co. in the 1890s
Holy Grail Temple, a mountain in the Grand Canyon
Holy Grail (web design), a CSS programming trick for dividing a web page into three columns
Stanley Cup, sometimes referred to as the "Holy Grail"
AFL Premiership, sometimes referred to as the "Holy Grail"

See also
Grail (disambiguation)
Grail Quest (disambiguation)
"The Unholy Grail", a 1962 sword and sorcery novella by Fritz Leiber